Arkan (also Romanized as Arkān) is a village in Aladagh Rural District, in the Central District of Bojnord County, North Khorasan Province, Iran. At the 2006 census, its population was 2,783, in 680 families.

The local language is Turkmen.

References 

Populated places in Bojnord County